Ultra Japan is an outdoor electronic music festival that is a part of Ultra Music Festival's worldwide expansion, which has now spread to twenty countries. Ultra Japan made its debut as a two-day festival during September 27–28, 2014, and took place at the Tokyo Odaiba Ultra Park in Tokyo, Japan.

History

2014 
The inaugural edition of Ultra Japan took place at the Tokyo Odaiba Ultra Park and featured three stages—the Main Stage, Ultra Worldwide Arena, and the UMF Radio Stage. The lineup included the likes of Morgan Page, W&W, Martin Garrix, Steve Angello, Hardwell, Sunnery James & Ryan Marciano, Fedde Le Grand, Afrojack, Axwell & Ingrosso, Pig & Dan, Kaskade, UMEK, Gina Turner, Mark Knight, Brass Knuckles, Darren Emerson, and many more. Ultra Japan's first edition drew an attendance of over 42,000 people.

2015 
For the following year, Ultra Japan expanded into a three-day festival and was once again held at Tokyo's Odaiba Ultra Park during the weekend of September 19–21, 2015. This edition included the same stages from the year before; Main Stage, Ultra Worldwide Arena, and UMF Radio Stage, but introduced the Resistance Stage for the final two days; which debuted at Ultra Music Festival earlier that year. Artists on the lineup included Dash Berlin, Justin Oh, Robin Schulz, David Guetta, DJ Snake, Afrojack, Mija, Carnage, Skrillex, Ksuke, Zeds Dead, Alesso, Pendulum, Chase and Status, Nic Fanciulli, John Digweed, Gorgon City, Sasha, and many more. Approximately 90,000 people were in attendance at Ultra Japan's second edition.

2016 
2016 marked Ultra Japan's third year taking place at the Tokyo Odaiba Ultra Park. The festival took place during the weekend of September 17–19, 2016 and it was confirmed via the Phase 1 lineup that deadmau5, Hardwell, Martin Garrix, Nero, DJ Snake, Jauz, and Marshmello were the first announced to play the three-day festival. Ultra Japan is strictly a festival for those twenty years old and over. The third edition of Ultra Japan also had  a Resistance stage for its second year in a row. The lineup for the Resistance stage included Dubfire, Art Department, Nic Fanciulli, Matador, Nicole Moudaber, Technasia, Yotto, Takkyu Ishino and many more. The Phase 2 lineup for Ultra Japan was released on August 3, 2016, and included Knife Party, Kygo, Tiesto, Zhu, Galantis, Gryffin, Shogun, Thomas Jack, W&W, Yotto, Carnage, Fedde Le Grand, and more. The festival featured three stages—Mainstage, Live Stage, and the Resistance stage. The 2016 edition of Ultra Japan welcomed 120,000 people in attendance to the Tokyo Odaiba Ultra Park.

2017 
The festival, which took place from September 16–18, saw performances by Alesso, Carl Cox, Hardwell, Kygo, KSHMR (live), SHRKTOPS, Steve Aoki, The Chainsmokers and Tiesto.

2022 
The 2022 edition of Ultra Japan will take place on September 17 and 18. It will see performances from the likes of Afrojack, KSHMR, Martin Garrix, Nicky Romero, Zedd and more.

See also 
 List of electronic dance music festivals
 Ultra Music Festival
 Russell Faibisch
 Ultra Australia
 Ultra Brasil
 Ultra Buenos Aires
 Road to Ultra
 Ultra Korea
 Ultra Chile
 Ultra Bali
 Ultra Singapore
 Ultra South Africa
 Ultra Europe

References

External links 
 Ultra Worldwide
 Ultra Japan
 Ultra Music Festival
 Resistance

Music festivals established in 2014
Festivals in Tokyo
Electronic music festivals in Japan
Summer events in Japan
Autumn events in Japan